Le Bourget is a commune in the northeastern suburbs of Paris, France.

The commune features Le Bourget Airport, which in turn hosts the Musée de l'Air et de l'Espace (Air and Space Museum). A very small part of Le Bourget Airport lies on the territory of the commune of Le Bourget, which nonetheless gave its name to the airport. Most of the airport lies on the territory of the communes of Dugny, Bonneuil-en-France, and Gonesse. The Bureau d'Enquêtes et d'Analyses pour la Sécurité de l'Aviation Civile is also headquartered on the airport grounds and in Le Bourget proper.

Transport

Rail
Le Bourget is served by Le Bourget rail station on Paris RER line B. There is also an extensive freight rail yard with international traffic to Belgium, among others.
Progressively, Le Bourget is planned to one of the principal transportation hub in the Paris North suburb : The Tangentielle Nord is an express tramway planned to enter in service in 2014, and two train stations are planned in the long term as part of the Grand Paris Express project with the future lines 16 and 17.

Highways
The town is served by two major Highways (Autoroutes), A1 autoroute in the north of the town, and A86 autoroute in the south of the city. Those two highways ensure a direct connection to major Paris Region hubs like La Defense (A86 West), Bobigny (A86 East), Roissy Charles de Gaulle Airport (A1 North), Paris (A1 South).

Air
Paris–Le Bourget Airport is the first business flights airport in Europe. It connects with 800 destinations in Europe.

On May 8, 1927, the White Bird (l'Oiseau blanc) took off from Le Bourget and its pilots, Charles Nungesser and François Coli, hoped to reach New York City without stopovers. Unfortunately the plane disappeared without a trace. It was finally Charles Lindbergh who made the first air crossing of the North Atlantic between New York and Paris on May 21, 1927. He was welcomed as the "victor" of the North Atlantic, posing on his Spirit of St. Louis. An enormous crowd also welcomed Edouard Daladier on September 29, 1938, after the signing of the Munich Agreement signed between Germany, France, the United Kingdom and Italy represented respectively by Adolf Hitler, Edouard Daladier, Neville Chamberlain and Benito Mussolini (who had acted as intermediary).

Population

Culture 
The world-renowned Gagosian Gallery is located in Le Bourget airport area.

Government and infrastructure 
Le Bourget houses the Crèche intercommunale Maryse Bastié, an intercommunal daycare.

Education

Schools 
École maternelle Saint-Exupéry is the sole maternelle public nursery school in Le Bourget, while École primaire Louis Blériot is the sole élémentaire- only public school in Le Bourget. Two municipal schools, Groupe scolaire Jean Jaurès and Groupe scolaire Jean Mermoz, serve both the maternelle and élémentaire levels. Collège Didier Daurat is the sole municipal collège (junior high school). There is one public high school, Lycée Germaine Tillion (dubbed Lycée du Bourget). Institution Privée Sainte-Marie, serving the maternelle, élémentaire and collège levels, is the sole private school in Le Bourget.

Libraries 
The  Le Bourget Public Library has 45,000 books and almost 100 magazines. It is located within the Urban Community of Le Bourget Airport (Communauté d'Agglomération de l'Aéroport du Bourget).

The Le Point d'Interrogation media library, located in Le Bourget, a stone's throw from the Place du Marché and the Town Hall, was inaugurated in 2013 and welcomes the general public to 750 square meters on one level. It is aimed at all public and offers nearly 30,000 documents, including books, CDs, DVDs and magazine in a wide variety of genres. The library was named after the aircraft Le Point d'Interrogation (the Question Mark), piloted by French aviators Dieudonné Costes and Maurice Bellonte who performed the first westbound crossing of the North Atlantic, from Paris to New York City.

Notable inhabitants 
 Germinal Pierre Dandelin (April 12, 1794 – February 15, 1847) was a mathematician, soldier, and professor of engineering.
 Vizeadmiral Lothar von Arnauld de la Perière (March 18, 1886 – February 24, 1941), born in Posen (now Poznań, Poland) and of French-German descent, was a German U-boat commander during World War I.
 Bernard Tapie (January 26,1943-October 3, 2021), lived at Le Bourget in the years 1950/1960 where he attended the Edgard-Quinet school (then renamed Didier-Daurat college). He lived with his parents and his younger brother Jean-Claude, at 11 Avenue Baudoin, in a very modest building that still exists.
 Jean Couvreur (August 18, 1903-July 16, 2001) was a journalist and a founding member of the Prix Interallié literary awards.
 Vincent Capo-Canellas (born 1967) is a French politician. He serves as a Senator for Seine-Saint-Denis.
 Franck Silvestre (1967), former French soccer player, was trained at the Bourget football school from 1975 to 1983.

International alliances 
Le Bourget has been twinned with

 Amityville, New York, USA since 1979
 Cullera, Spain, since 1982
 Little Falls, Minnesota, USA since 1987
 and Zhukovsky in Russia, since 1993.

Gallery

See also 

 Communes of the Seine-Saint-Denis department

References

External links 

 Commune of Le Bourget 

Communes of Seine-Saint-Denis
Venues of the 2024 Summer Olympics
Olympic shooting venues
Seine-Saint-Denis communes articles needing translation from French Wikipedia